Zhang Hanlan (born July 19, 1979 in Shenyang, Liaoning) is a female Chinese basketball player. She was part of the teams that won gold medals at the 2002 Asian Games and the 2010 Asian Games. Zhang also competed for China at the 2008 Summer Olympics where the team came in fourth place.

References

1979 births
Living people
Olympic basketball players of China
Basketball players at the 2008 Summer Olympics
Basketball players from Shenyang
Chinese women's basketball players
Asian Games medalists in basketball
Basketball players at the 2002 Asian Games
Basketball players at the 2010 Asian Games
Asian Games gold medalists for China
Medalists at the 2002 Asian Games
Medalists at the 2010 Asian Games
Shenyang Army Golden Lions players